Rabat is a 2011 Dutch road film, and the first film made by Jim Taihattu and Victor Ponten, from independent Dutch advertising company Habbekrats. It was filmed in the summer of 2010 during a period of five weeks. The premiere was on the 6 June 2011 at Tuschinski in Amsterdam.

The three main characters are played by Nasrdin Dchar, Achmed Akkabi and Marwan Kenzari. The film was shot by a young cameraman from the Netherlands: Lennart Verstegen.

Plot
In the movie Nadir (Nasrdin Dchar) has to bring a taxi that used to belong to his dad, to his uncle in Rabat, in Morocco.

At first he intends to go alone, but his two friends Abdel (Achmed Akkabi) and Zakaria (Marwan Kenzari) invite themselves along. They travel through the Netherlands, Belgium, France, Spain and Morocco. Along the way they experience all kind of things. In France they picked up a hitchhiker called Julie (Stéphane Caillard) with whom he falls in love. In Spain they get arrested and treated unfairly by the police, and when they go clubbing in Barcelona with Julie and her friends, they aren't allowed in the club, because they're foreigners. Along the way Nadir is keeping a secret from his two best friends with whom he has been friends with for seventeen years, and is planning on opening a shoarma restaurant with. The secret causes a big fight on their way there, but also makes their friendship stronger.

At the end they all go their own way; Nadir goes back to Barcelona, to Julie, Zakaria goes to visit and find his family in Tunisia, and Abdel goes back to Amsterdam to start up their shoarma restaurant.

Cast
Nasrdin Dchar as Nadir
Achmed Akkabi as Abdel
Marwan Kenzari as Zakaria
Stéphane Caillard as Julie
Nadia Kounda as Yasmina
Slimane Dazi as Dade Exporter

References

External links
 
 Rabat on Cineuropa

2011 films
2010s Dutch-language films
Dutch drama road movies
2010s drama road movies
Films about automobiles
Films directed by Jim Taihuttu